Peru competed at the 2011 Pan American Games in Guadalajara, Mexico from October 14 to 30, 2011, sending 139 athletes in 22 sports.

Medalists

Athletics

Men
Track and road events

Field events

Women
Track and road events

Field events

Badminton

Peru has qualified four male and four female athletes in the badminton competition.

Men

Women

Mixed

Basque pelota

Men

Bowling

Peru has qualified two male and two female athletes in the bowling competition.

Men
Individual

Pairs

Women
Individual

Pairs

Boxing

Men

Equestrian

Jumping
Individual jumping

Team jumping

Gymnastics

Artistic
Peru has qualified two male and one female athletes in the artistic gymnastics competition.

Men
Individual qualification & Team Finals

Individual Finals

Women
Individual qualification & Team Finals

Individual Finals

Judo

Peru has qualified four athletes in the 60 kg, 66 kg, 81 kg, and 100+kg men's categories and two athletes in the 48 kg and 52 kg women's categories.

Men

Repechage Rounds

Women

Repechage Rounds

Karate

Peru has qualified four athletes in the 60 kg, 67 kg, 75 kg and 84 kg men's categories and one athlete in the 61 kg women's category.

Rowing

Men

Women

Sailing

Peru has qualified four boats and seven athletes in the sailing competition.

Men

Women

Open

Shooting

Men

Women

Squash

Peru has qualified three male athletes in the squash competition

Men

Swimming

Men

Women

Table tennis

Peru has qualified one male and three female athletes in the table tennis competition.

Men

Women

Taekwondo

Peru has qualified two female athletes in the 49 kg and 57 kg categories and one male athlete in the 68 kg category.

Men

Women

Tennis

Peru had qualified three female athletes and three male athletes.

Men

Women

Mixed

Triathlon

Men

Volleyball

Peru qualified for the women's tournament. The team will be made up of 12 athletes.
Women

Team

1 Angélica Aquino
2 Mirtha Uribe
4 Patricia Soto (c)
5 Vanessa Palacios (L)
6 Jessenia Uceda
7 Yulissa Zamudio
10 Luren Baylon
11 Clarivett Yllescas
12 Carla Rueda
14 Elena Keldibekova
15 Karla Ortiz
16 Alexandra Muñoz

Group B

Quarterfinals

Fifth to eighth place classification

Fifth place match

Water skiing

Peru has qualified two male and three female athletes in the water skiing competition.

Men

Women

Weightlifting

Wrestling

Peru has qualified one athlete in the 74 kg men's freestyle category, two athletes in the 55 kg and 74 kg men's Greco-Roman categories, and three athletes in the 48 kg, 55 kg and 63 kg women's freestyle categories.

Men
Freestyle

Greco-Roman

Women
Freestyle

References

Nations at the 2011 Pan American Games
P
2011
Swimming in Peru